Rabbi Haninah ben Teradion ( Ḥănīnāʾ ben Təraḏyōn) or Hananiah ( Ḥănanyā) ben Teradion was a teacher in the third Tannaitic generation (2nd century). He was a contemporary of Eleazar ben Perata I and of Halafta, together with whom he established certain ritual rules. He was one of the Ten Martyrs murdered by the Romans for ignoring the ban on teaching Torah.

Life and work 
His residence was at Sikhnin, where he directed religious affairs as well as a school. The latter came to be numbered among the distinguished academies with reference to which a baraitha says: "The saying 'That which is altogether just shall you follow' may be construed, 'Follow the sages in their respective academies. ... Follow Rabbi Haninah ben Teradion in Sikhnin'".

Haninah administered the communal charity funds, and so scrupulous was he in that office that once when money of his own, designed for personal use on Purim, chanced to get mixed with the charity funds, he distributed the whole amount among the poor. Eleazar ben Jacob II so admired Haninah's honesty that he remarked, "No one ought to contribute to the charity treasury unless its administrator is like Haninah ben Teradion".

Comparatively few halakhot are preserved from him. One of Haninah's most respected proofs regarded that the Shekhinah rests on those who study the Law.

Martyrdom 
During the Hadrianic persecutions decrees were promulgated imposing the most rigorous penalties on the observers of the Jewish law, and especially upon those who occupied themselves with the promulgation of that law. Nevertheless, Hananiah conscientiously followed his chosen profession; he convened public assemblies and taught Torah. 

For this he and his wife were condemned to death, and their daughter to degradation (rape and forced prostitution). He was wrapped in a Torah scroll and set ablaze on a bed of grass. Wet wool was placed on his chest to prolong his suffering. His disciples begged him to open his mouth so that the fire could "enter" and kill him faster, but Haninah refused. Thereupon the executioner removed the wool and fanned the flame, thus accelerating the end, but in doing so the flames caught him and he burned to death as well. It is said that as he burned, he claimed to see the letters on the scroll flying up to heaven.

Notable family members 
Of the surviving members of Haninah's family mentioned are two daughters: Bruriah, who became the wife of Rabbi Meir; and one who was held in a brothel, whom Rabbi Meir succeeded in rescuing.

Haninah had also several sons, one of whom was rather learned. It is related that Simon ben Haninah applied to this son for information on a point of discussion, and that the latter and his sister, presumably Bruriah, furnished divergent opinions. When Judah ben Baba heard of those opinions, he remarked, "Haninah's daughter teaches better than his son."

Elsewhere it is reported of a son, perhaps the same, that became a degenerate, associating with bandits. Subsequently, he apparently betrayed his criminal associates, who retaliated by killing him and filling his mouth with sand and gravel. Having discovered his remains, the people wished to eulogize him as a community out of respect for his father, but the latter would not permit it.

References

 It has the following bibliography:
W. Bacher, Ag. Tan. i.397;
Brüll, Mebo ha-Mishnah, i.140;
Z. Frankel, Darke ha-Mishnah, p. 133;
Hamburger, R. B. T. ii.132;
Heilprin, Seder ha-Dorot, ii;
Zacuto, Yuḥasin, ed. Filipowski, p. 32a.

Mishnah rabbis
2nd-century rabbis
Jewish martyrs
People executed by the Roman Empire
People executed by burning